The following is a list 2015 NPF transactions that have occurred in the National Pro Fastpitch softball league since the completion of the 2014 season and during the 2015 season. It lists which team each player has been traded to, signed by, or claimed by, and for which player(s) or draft pick (s), if applicable. Players who have retired are also listed.

Transactions 
Source:Any transactions listed below without a reference were originally announced on

References

External links 
 

NPF Transactions